Asare Bediako Senior High School (also known as ABSEC) is a mixed second cycle institution in Akrokerri in the Adansi North District in the Ashanti Region of Ghana.

History 
The school was established in 1993. In 2012, the headmaster of the school was Mr. C. W. Nuakoh. In 2017, Anglogold Ashanti provided the school with mechanized boreholes and water tanks. In 2021, the headmaster of the school was Dr. Emmanuel Asiedu. In 2021, Helping Africa Foundation provided the school with ICT centers.

Features 
The school is close to a waterlogged valley and sits on about 75-acres of land.

References 

High schools in Ghana
1993 establishments in Ghana
Public schools in Ghana